Willi Martin Arlt (27 October 1919 – 27 July 1947) was a German international footballer.

International career 
In eleven international friendly matches the Riesa forward scored two goals before and during the Second World War.

Personal life
Arlt served as an Unteroffizier (sergeant) in the German Army during the war. Captured by Soviet forces, he died in a prisoner of war camp in Karachev, Russia on 27 July 1947.

References

External links
 
 
 
 

1919 births
1947 deaths
German footballers
Association football wingers
Germany international footballers
BSG Stahl Riesa players
German Army soldiers of World War II
German prisoners of war in World War II held by the Soviet Union
German people who died in Soviet detention
Footballers from Saxony
20th-century German people